I'm Movin' On is the third studio album recorded by American singer CeCe Peniston, released on September 9, 1996, by A&M Records. Taking Peniston's work deeper foray into mainstream R&B genre, A&M consulted a number of pop musicians to record with her, including Dave Hall, Gordon Chambers, and Andrea Martin. Other collaborated include DJ Steve "Silk" Hurley, Damon Thomas, Danny Sembello, Darryl Pearson, and Jorge "G-Man" Corante.

Upon release, the album garnered mixed to favorable reviews from music critics. Most of them criticized the predominant promoting of R&B tracks, as well as her label for insistence on Peniston abandoning dance community in favor of urban arena. In terms of chart performance, the album has been viewed as a commercial failure with no entry on the US Billboard 200, nor overseas. The only out of two released singles that cracked the US Billboard Hot 100 list was the lead single "Movin' On", which climbed to number eighty-three, eventually. "Somebody Else's Guy", an update of Jocelyn Brown's hit from 1984, became a surprising hit for Peniston in addition, after being promoted as support of her greatest hits compilation, and the closing release under her contract with A&M.

Background
I'm Movin' On was supposed to be Peniston's deeper foray into mainstream R&B followed the pattern of her previous release Thought 'Ya Knew (1994), in which Peniston began her unsuccessful transition into the R&B market. The label heavily focusing on hip-hop influenced R&B jams and a variety of slow ballads invited several producers to join her session, in front of Dave Hall and Gordon Chambers, who co-wrote the title track. This time, Peniston reprised her fellow collaboration with Steve Hurley on two songs. "The Last to Know" that she co-wrote, and "Don't Know What to Do". None of these would be released on single, though. In order to push her musical horizons further, A&M also featured JoJo Hailey of the group Jodeci and Tenina Stevens (also known as Suga T), as the first time ever that another artists would be vocally credited on her record.

Critical reception

I'm Movin' On met with mixed to favorable reviews from music critics. AllMusic editor Jose F. Promis labeled the A&M calculations to reincarnate Peniston into an R&B diva as "total alienation of her core fans" and her "career killer". Apart from giving the album two and a half (out of five) stars, he branded most of songs as "R&B clichés of the 1990s abound", but praised "Don't Know What to Do" and the singer's cover version of "Somebody Else's Guy". William Stevenson from Entertainment Weekly foresaw in his B-graded review that the "blah ballads" are [to be] waste of Peniston's voice tailor-made for dance genre, citing also Jocelyn Brown's  "Don't Know What to Do" and "House Party" as the album's most powerful pipes that should not had been overlooked on single. Rudi Meyer of Vibe was the most enthusiastic about Peniston's approach towards R&B mainstream. Appealing to the singer's past urban hit singles (such as "Keep on Walkin", "Inside That I Cried" and "I'm in the Mood"), she found potential in her new material (namely in "The Last to Know", "If It Should Rain" and "Before I Lay"). Meyer rated the final result as "mostly pleasing outcome". Nevertheless, she praised club oriented tracks at the same time.

Chart performance
Two weeks after its official shipping to music stores, the album entered the US Billboard Top R&B/Hip-Hop Albums Chart at number forty-eight (its peak) on September 28, 1996. In total, the set spent four weeks in the component chart, with no appearance in the Billboard 200, or in the overseas albums charts.

Track listing

Notes
 denotes additional producer

Credits and personnel

 Scott Ahaus – Engineer, Mixing
 Anas Allaf – Guitar
 Keith Andes – Keyboards
 Ryan Arnold – Engineer, Mixing Assistant
 Craig Bauer – Mixing
 Bradley – Guitar, Keyboards, Producer, Programming
 Bob Brockman – Mixing
 Annette Brown – Composer
 Jocelyn Brown – Composer
 Sue Ann Carwell – Vocals (Background)
 Gordon Chambers – Composer, Vocal Arrangement
 Rob Chiarelli – Mixing
 Darren "Nitro" Clowers – Composer, Drum Programming, Keyboards, Producer
 Jorge Corante – Bass, Composer, Keyboards, Piano, Producer, Remixing
 Robert Daniels – Composer
 M. Doc – Vocal Arrangement
 Gerard Dure – Hair Stylist
 Daniela Federici – Photography
 Neil Gustafson – Mixing Assistant
 Stephanie Gylden – Assistant Engineer
 Joel "JoJo" Hailey – Composer, Guest Artist, Producer, Vocals (Background)
 Dave "Jam" Hall – Composer, Producer
 Leroy Harris – Composer
 Steve "Silk" Hurley – Arranger, Composer, Engineer, Producer
 Brion James – Guitar
 Booker T. Jones – Mixing
 Damon Jones – Executive Producer
 Adam Kagan – Engineer, Mixing
 Leslie King – Bass
 Manny Lehman – Executive Producer
 Gene Lo – Assistant Engineer
 Paul Logus – Engineer, Mixing
 Romny Malco – Composer, Drum Programming, Producer
 Stephen Marcussen – Mastering
 Andrea Martin – Composer
 Victor McCoy – Assistant Engineer
 Glenn McKinney – Guitar
 Derek Nakamoto – Sampling, String Arrangements
 Nzingha – Make-Up
 Emanuel Officer – Composer, Vocal Arrangement, Vocals (Background)
 John Pace – Mixing
 Darryl Pearson – Composer, Producer, Programming
 CeCe Peniston – Composer, Primary Artist, Vocals (Background)
 Oji Pierce – Composer, Engineer, Keyboards, Producer, Programming
 Greg Ross – Art Direction, Design
 Danny Sembello – Arranger, Composer, Engineer, Producer, Vocal Arrangement
 Michael Sembello – Guitar
 Randy Smith – Stylist
 Bradley Spalter – Composer
 The Storm – Producer, Vocals (Background)
 Louis Taylor, Jr. – Saxophone
 D. Thomas – Composer
 Vachik – Engineer, Mixing
 Curtis "Fitz" Williams – Flute, Saxophone
 Albert Willis – Arranger, Composer, Engineer, Horn Arrangements, Producer, Vocal Arrangement
 Jimmy Wright – Keyboards
 John Wydrycs – Engineer

Charts

Release history

References
General

Specific

External links
 

CeCe Peniston albums
1996 albums
A&M Records albums